Meine schönsten Jahre is a German television series.

See also
List of German television series

External links
 

2004 German television series debuts
2004 German television series endings
Television shows set in Berlin
German-language television shows
RTL (German TV channel) original programming